Forging a Future Self is the debut studio album by American progressive metal band After the Burial. It was recorded in 2005 and released on March 1, 2006 through Corrosive Recordings.

Background
The songs "Warm Thoughts of Warfare", "Forging a Future Self", "Isolation Theory" and "Fingers Like Daggers" were originally recorded for the band's Demo 2005.

Forging a Future Self is the only album to feature the band's original vocalist Nick Wellner and drummer Greg Erickson who were replaced by Grant Luoma and Dan Carle respectively when the band was signed to Sumerian Records later in 2007.

"A Steady Decline", "Fingers Like Daggers" and "Redeeming the Wretched" were re-recorded in 2013 for the EP This Life Is All We Have.

Track listing

Personnel
After the Burial
 Nick Wellner – lead vocals
 Trent Hafdahl – lead guitar, backing vocals
 Justin Lowe – rhythm guitar, programming, production
 Lerichard "Lee" Foral – bass
 Greg Erickson – drums

References

2006 debut albums
After the Burial albums